The Borisova Gradina TV Tower, or the Old TV Tower, is a  TV tower (including the aerial) in the garden Borisova gradina in Sofia, the capital of Bulgaria. It is known as the tower used for the first Bulgarian National Television broadcasts in 1959.

History 

The tower was designed by architect Lyuben Podponev, engineer A. Voynov and technologist Georgi Kopkanov. Construction began in December 1958 and the tower was officially opened on 26 December 1959.

In 1962 the Borisova Gradina TV Tower was the place from which the first Bulgarian VHF radio broadcast (of the Bulgarian National Radio's Programme 1) was realized. Programme 2 of the BNR's broadcasting began in 1965, and Programme 3's in 1971. BNT's Kanal 1 transmitter was replaced with a more modern conforming to the OIRT colour television requirements in January 1972, and the broadcasting of Efir 2 began in 1975.

Since 1985 the newer Vitosha Mountain TV Tower has been the main facility for broadcasting television and the programs of the Bulgarian National Radio in and around Sofia. The Old TV Tower broadcasts private radio stations as well as DVB-T terrestrial television.

References

See also 
 List of tallest structures in Bulgaria
 List of tallest towers

External links

 

Towers in Bulgaria
Buildings and structures in Sofia
Buildings and structures completed in 1959